The following is a timeline of the history of the city of Leicester, England.

Prior to 16th century

 48 CE – The Roman town of Ratae Corieltauvorum is established (approx. date)
 120/121 CE - Ratae Corieltauvorum on Fosse Way, was a municipality.
 130 CE – Jewry Wall built by Romans (approx. date).
 145 CE – Public baths built by Romans (approx. date).
 150 CE – The "Blackfriars Pavement" is laid (approximate date)
 155 CE – The "Peacock Pavement" is laid (approx. date)
 680 – Cuthwine is installed as the first Anglo-Saxon Bishop of Leicester
 870 – Leicester ceases to be a separate diocese when the last Saxon Bishop flees from the invading Danes.
 877 – The Danes are in power.
 880 – St Nicholas' Church active (next to Jewry Wall (approx. date).
 1070 – Leicester Castle built (approx. date).
 1086
 Market active.
 St Margaret's Church and St Martin's Church are active (approx. date).
 In the Domesday survey, the walled town occupies 130 acres, with 322 houses and 6 churches.
 1107 – Castle Chapel is founded.
 1118 - Death of Robert de Beaumont, 1st Earl of Leicester who owned the town.
 1143 – Leicester Abbey is founded by Robert le Bossu, Earl of Leicester.
 1228 – Leicester fair active.
 1230 – Franciscan monastery active (approx. date).
 1307 - Edward III. granted a fair for 17 days after the feast of the Holy Trinity.
 1330 – Trinity Hospital is founded.
 1350 – Guild of Corpus Christi constituted.
 1390 – Corpus Christi Guildhall built (approx. date).
 1444 – Most of St Margaret's Church is rebuilt, including the West Tower (approx. date).
 1485 – Richard III spends his last night in Leicester before the Battle of Bosworth Field. His body is afterwards brought back to the town and buried at Greyfriars.

16th–18th centuries
 1511 – Wigston's Chantry House is built in the Newarke (approximate date).
 1513 – Wyggeston Hospital founded.
 1530 – Cardinal Thomas Wolsey dies at Leicester Abbey. 
 1535 – The Greyfriars Monastery is closed. 
 1538 – With the Dissolution of the Monasteries, Leicester Abbey is surrendered to the king and demolished.
 1548 – The Guild of Corpus Christi is dissolved.
 1550 – The Free Grammar School is established by this year, using money left by William Wyggeston .
 1589 – Corporation of Leicester established.
 1595 – Skeffington House is built in the Newarke (approximate date).
 1642 – Charles I passes through Leicester before raising his standard at Nottingham.
 1645 – The Siege of Leicester during the English Civil War.
 1680 - Knitting frames for hosiery were introduced about this time.
 1751 – Leicester Journal newspaper begins publication.
 1770 – Daniel Lambert is born in Leicester  
 1771 – Leicester Royal Infirmary opens.
 1773 – The High Cross in High Street was removed.
 1785 – The Greencoat School is established with money left by Alderman Gabriel Newton .
 1792 – Leicester Chronicle newspaper begins publication.
 1794 - The corporation sanctioned several fairs.
 1800 – Leicester Medical Book Society founded.

19th century
 1801 – Population: 17,005.
 1804 – The South Fields are enclosed.
 1806 – Racecourse established.
 1817 – Leicester Savings Bank established.
 1821 – Leicester Gas Company is established.
 1825 – Wharf Street Cricket Ground opens, home to the Leicestershire County Cricket Club.
 1828 – The new Leicester Prison opens on Welford Road.
 1832
 Leicester and Swannington Railway begins operating.
 Christ Church built.
 1835 –  Leicester Literary and Philosophical Society founded.
 1836
 Leicester Borough Police Force is established.
 The Theatre Royal opens in Horsefair Street.
 1838 – Union Workhouse built.
 1840 ---The Midland Counties Railway from Derby to Rugby opened, with a station at Campbell Street, Leicester.
 1845 – Particular Baptist Chapel opens.
 1849
 Chamber of Commerce established.
 Leicester Museum & Art Gallery opens 
 1851 – A pumping station is built near the River Soar under the Leicester Sewerage Act.
 1853
Rowe's Circulating Library in business.
 Leicester gains its first piped water supply 
 1857
 Hitchin-Leicester railway begins operating.
 Leicester Guardian newspaper begins publication.
 1860 – Major restoration of St Martin's Church is begun; the tower and spire are demolished and rebuilt.
 1861 – Population: 68,056.
 1862 – Joseph Merrick, the "Elephant Man", is born in Leicester 
 1863 – The Old Bow Bridge is demolished and replaced with an iron bridge.
 1864
 South Leicestershire Railway (Hinckley-Leicester) begins operating.
 Leicester balloon riot
 1866
 Leicester's first working men's club opens 
 The Collegiate School for Girls opens.
 1867 – Leicester Cathedral built.
 1868 – Haymarket Memorial Clock Tower erected.
 1870 - Leicester School of Art founded.
 1871
 The Free Library opens in Wellington Street.
 Population: 95,084.
 1872 – Leicester Borough Fire Brigade is established.
 1874
 Leicester's first horse-drawn tram service begins operating, from the Clock Tower to Belgrave.
 Leicester Mercury newspaper begins publication.
 1875 – Trams begin operating from the town centre to Victoria Park and Humberstone.
 1876
 Leicester Town Hall is built.
 Leicester Co-operative Hosiery Manufacturing Society organised.
 1877
 The Wyggeston Hospital School opens.
 Skating rink opens in Rutland Street.
 Leicester Bicycling Club active (approximate date).
 The Opera House opens in Silver Street.
 1878 – Leicestershire County Cricket Club's new ground at Grace Road opens 
 1878 - Leicestershire Lawn Tennis Club Established 
 1879 – The first municipal swimming baths open in Bath Lane.
 1880 – Leicester Tigers Rugby Union Football Club is founded 
 1881 – Population: 122,351.
 1882 – Victoria Park and Abbey Park open.
 1884 – Leicester Fosse football club formed.
 1885 – Leicester and Leicestershire Photographic Society founded.
 1886 – Spinney Hill Park opens.
 1889
 Leicester becomes a County borough per Local Government Act 1888.
 Leicester Branch of the Socialist League organised.
 1891
 Filbert Street stadium opens.
 Abbey Pumping Station in operation.
 The Borough of Leicester is greatly enlarged by the Leicester Extension Act, with the addition of Aylestone, Belgrave, Knighton, Newfoundpool and parts of Braunstone, Evington and Humberstone.
 Population: 174,624.
 1892
 Leicester Tigers move to their new home at Welford Road Stadium
 London Road Station replaced Campbell Street Station.
 Belgrave became part of Leicester
1894 – Leicester Fosse joined the Football League.
 1896
 Leicester Corporation purchases Gilroes and begins laying out a cemetery there.
 All of the civil parishes within the Borough of Leicester are merged into a single parish.
 1898 – The Grand Hotel is built in Granby Street.
 1899
 British United Shoe Machinery is established in Belgrave Road.
 Leicester Central railway station opened. (closed 1969)

20th century

 1901 - Population: 211,579.
 1904 – The conversion of Leicester's horse-drawn trams to electric trams is completed.
 1905 - Leicester General Hospital opened.
 1906 – Future Prime Minister Ramsay MacDonald was elected as one of the two MPs for Leicester.
 1913 – De Montfort Hall opens.
 1919 – Leicester attains city status.
 1920 – The City Boys School opens .
 1921
 The University College of Leicester is established.
 Population: 234,000.
 1923 – In the General Election, Winston Churchill is the Liberal candidate in Leicester West and loses.
 1925 – Braunstone Frith is absorbed into the city of Leicester.
 1927 
St Martin's Church becomes Leicester Cathedral.
Dr. Cyril Bardsley is appointed the first Bishop of Leicester.
 1932 – The Little Theatre opens in Dover Street.
 1935 – Humberstone, Knighton, New Parks and Beaumont Leys are absorbed into the city of Leicester.
 1936
 The city boundaries were further extended to include most of Evington 
 Odeon Cinema opened.
 1940 – Leicester suffers its worst air raid of World War II on the night of 19 November.
 1947 - University of Leicester Botanic Garden opened.
 1958 – Rock 'N' Roll comes to Leicester when Buddy Holly and the Crickets perform live at De Montfort Hall
 1962 – Jewry Wall Museum built.
 1963 – The Beatles perform live at De Montfort Hall for the first time.
 1966 – The City of Leicester Polytechnic is established.
 1969 – The Museum of the Royal Leicestershire Regiment opens in the Magazine Gateway.
 1970 – University of Leicester's Attenborough Building constructed.
 1972 – Abbey Pumping Station museum opens.
 1973
 Haymarket Shopping Centre in business.
 Leicester Theatre Trust formed.
 1974 – Leicester City Council established per Local Government Act 1972.
 1985 – St Margaret's Bus Station opens.
 1992 – The Leicester Polytechnic becomes De Montfort University.
 1997
 Leicester City Council becomes unitary authority per 1990s UK local government reform.
 Leicester Bike Park opens.

21st century

 2002 – King Power Stadium opens.
 2011 – Institution of an elected mayor.
 2012 
Queen Elizabeth II, the Duke of Edinburgh and the Duchess of Cambridge visit Leicester during the Queen's Golden Jubilee tour of Britain.
The remains of King Richard III are discovered beneath a Council car park.  Plans are begun for his eventual reinterment in Leicester Cathedral.
 2016 - Leicester City win the 2015–16 Premier League for their first league title, being 5000-to-1 outsiders at the start of the season, and won the BBC Sports Personality Team of the Year Award.

See also
 History of Leicester
 History of Leicestershire
 Timelines of other cities in East Midlands: Derby, Lincoln, Nottingham

References

Further reading

Published in the 19th century

1800s–1840s

1850s–1890s

Published in the 20th century

External links

 . Includes digitised directories of Leicester, various dates
 
 

Years in England
 
Leicester
Leicester
Leicester-related lists